Qaleh-ye Sheykh or Qaleh Sheykh may refer to:

Qaleh-ye Sheykh, Alborz
Qaleh-ye Sheykh, East Azerbaijan
Qaleh-ye Sheykh, Hamadan
Qaleh-ye Sheykh, Khuzestan
Qaleh-ye Sheykh, Lorestan
Qaleh Sheykh, Markazi
Qaleh-ye Sheykh, Tehran